Kenny Morrison (born December 31, 1974) is an American actor, born in Los Angeles, California, who began his career as a child actor.

Morrison took over the role of Atreyu in The NeverEnding Story II: The Next Chapter. His first role was as Tom McKaskel in the TV movie The Quick and the Dead, based on the novel by Louis L'Amour. Morrison has also appeared in number of TV series, including Our House, Who's the Boss? and Growing Pains. He had a small but memorable role in the episode "Learning Curve" of Star Trek: Voyager, in which he played the introverted young Bajoran Gerron, a former Maquis insurgent. He has also appeared in some films, including Little Athens. Morrison is an active director and photographer.

References

External links
 

Living people
1974 births
American male film actors
American male actors of Mexican descent
American male child actors
American male television actors